Tupai, also called Motu Iti, is a low-lying atoll in Society Islands, French Polynesia. It lies 19 km to the north of Bora Bora and belongs to the western Leeward Islands (French: Îles Sous-le-vent). This small atoll is only 11 km2 in area. Its broad coral reef encloses a shallow sandy lagoon. There are almost continuous long wooded motus on Tupai's reef. Tupai has no permanent residents apart from some workers in the coconut plantations. There is a private airfield on Tupai; it was inaugurated in 2001, and its use is restricted.

Administration
The atoll of Tupai belongs administratively to the commune of Bora Bora.

In 1926 the island was considered for settling a small community of Slovak colonists but was later dropped in favor of the Marquesas Islands

External links
 

Atolls of the Society Islands